Algirdas Endriukaitis (born 23 November 1936) is a Lithuanian politician, born in Kaunas. In 1990 he was among those who signed the Act of the Re-Establishment of the State of Lithuania.

References
 Biography

1936 births
Living people
Politicians from Kaunas
Members of the Seimas
Vilnius University alumni
Signatories of the Act of the Re-Establishment of the State of Lithuania